Super Bowl XVI was an American football game between the National Football Conference (NFC) champion San Francisco 49ers and the American Football Conference (AFC) champion Cincinnati Bengals to decide the National Football League (NFL) champion for the 1981 season. The 49ers defeated the Bengals by the score of 26–21 to win their first Super Bowl.

The game was played on January 24, 1982, at the Pontiac Silverdome in Pontiac, Michigan, a suburb of Detroit. It marked the first time that a Super Bowl was held in a cold-weather city. The domed stadium saved the crowd at the game from the cold and snowy weather, but the weather did affect traffic and other logistical issues related to the game. Super Bowl XVI also became one of the most watched broadcasts in American television history, with more than 85 million viewers, and a final national Nielsen rating of 49.1 (a 73 share).

For the first time since Super Bowl III, both teams were making their first Super Bowl appearance. The 49ers posted a 13–3 regular season record, and playoff wins over the New York Giants and the Dallas Cowboys. The Bengals finished the regular season with a 12–4 record, and had postseason victories over the Buffalo Bills and the San Diego Chargers.

Cincinnati's 356 yards of offense to San Francisco's 275 marked the first time in Super Bowl history that a team which was outgained in total yards won. The Bengals also committed four turnovers to San Francisco's one, which played a major factor in the outcome. Three of Cincinnati's turnovers helped San Francisco build a then-Super Bowl record 20–0 halftime lead, off a touchdown pass and a rushing touchdown from quarterback Joe Montana and two field goals by Ray Wersching. The Bengals began to rally in the second half with quarterback Ken Anderson's 5-yard touchdown run and 4-yard touchdown pass, but a third-quarter goal line stand by the 49ers defense and two more Wersching field goals ultimately decided the game. The Bengals managed to score their final touchdown with 16 seconds left, but could not recover the ensuing onside kick. Montana was named the Super Bowl MVP, completing 14 of 22 passes for 157 yards and one touchdown, while also rushing for 18 yards and a touchdown on the ground. Cincinnati tight end Dan Ross recorded a Super Bowl-record 11 receptions (still the most ever by a tight end in a Super Bowl) for 104 yards and 2 touchdowns.

Background

Venue selection
The NFL awarded Super Bowl XVI to Detroit on March 13, 1979, at the owners' meetings in Honolulu. For the first time, three Super Bowl host cities were deliberated and selected at the same meeting (XV, XVI, and XVII). A total of eight cities submitted bids: New Orleans, Detroit (Silverdome), Pasadena (Rose Bowl), Los Angeles (Coliseum), Miami, Seattle (Kingdome), Dallas (Cotton Bowl), and Houston (Rice Stadium). For the first time, a northern, cold weather climate city was picked to host a Super Bowl. The game would be played inside the Pontiac Silverdome, in the Detrot suburb of Pontiac. Former NFL executive director Don Weiss wrote in his book "The Making of the Super Bowl" that the game had been awarded to the Silverdome by the league as a "reward" to the locally-headquartered automobile companies Ford Motor Company and Chrysler for their "many years of sponsoring pro football". Automotive executives Tom Murphy (GM), Henry Ford II (Ford), John J. Riccardo (Chrysler), and Gerald C. Meyers (AMC) were all members of the Detroit host committee.

Michigan governor William Milliken, Detroit mayor Coleman Young, and Pontiac mayor Wallace E. Holland were part of the delegation, and notably offered the Silverdome rent-free. Detroit received rousing support from several NFL owners, including George Halas, Art Rooney, and Paul Brown. New Orleans (XV) and Pasadena (XVII) were other cities chosen at the meeting.

After hosting five previous Super Bowls, Miami was noticeably left out, largely due the aging condition of the Orange Bowl, and for a hotel room mix-up at Super Bowl XIII two months earlier. Dolphins owner Joe Robbie, locked in an ongoing feud with the city of Miami and Dade County over stadium improvements or construction of a new stadium, actually lobbied against Miami hosting the game. Robbie convinced the other owners to vote down Miami, in an effort to gain leverage towards building a new stadium. South Florida would not be selected to host another Super Bowl until Joe Robbie Stadium was built, and it hosted XXIII.

San Francisco 49ers

San Francisco finished the regular season with a league-best 13–3 record. The 49ers' success surprised many because they finished with a 6–10 record during the previous season and a 2–14 record in 1979 (they even still had home blackouts early on in the 1981 season, the last blackouts for the 49ers to date). A major reason for the team's improvement was the emergence of their young quarterback Joe Montana. In just his third season in the league, Montana completed 311 out of 488 passes (a league-leading 63.7 completion percentage) for 3,565 yards and 19 touchdowns (he also threw 12 interceptions). His favorite targets were receivers Dwight Clark (85 receptions, 1,104 yards, and 4 touchdowns) and Freddie Solomon (59 receptions, 969 yards, and 8 touchdowns), along with tight end Charle Young (37 receptions for 400 yards and 5 touchdowns). Running back Ricky Patton was the top rusher on the team with 543 yards and 4 touchdowns, while also catching 27 passes for 195 yards. Multi-talented running back Earl Cooper also provided the team with a good running and receiving threat, rushing for 330 yards and catching 51 passes for 477 yards. Much of San Francisco's success was aided by their offensive line, which featured Dan Audick (LT), John Ayers (LG), Fred Quillan (C), Randy Cross (RG), and Keith Fahnhorst (RT).

Although the 49ers had three rookies starting as defensive backs, they all were major defensive threats: Carlton Williamson recorded four interceptions, Eric Wright had three, and Ronnie Lott, who had the best season of his career, recorded seven interceptions and tied an NFL record by returning three of them for touchdowns. Three-year veteran defensive back Dwight Hicks led the team with nine interceptions, which he returned for 239 yards and a touchdown, giving the secondary a total of 23. Defensive end Fred Dean and linebacker Jack "Hacksaw" Reynolds were big contributors up front, making it difficult for the opposing teams to rush the ball; Dean became a 49er after an in-season trade with the San Diego Chargers and piled up 12 sacks for San Francisco.

Cincinnati Bengals

The Bengals finished with the best regular-season record in the AFC at 12–4. Cincinnati was also a surprise team because, like the 49ers, they had recorded a 6–10 record during the previous season. Until the 1981 season, they had never won a playoff game in their entire history.

Bengals quarterback Ken Anderson (who had the best season of his career)  was the top rated passer in the league and won both the NFL Most Valuable Player Award and the NFL Comeback Player of the Year Award. He completed 300 of 479 (62.6 percent) passes for 3,754 yards and 29 touchdowns, with only 10 interceptions. Anderson was also an outstanding scrambler, rushing for 320 yards and one touchdown, leading all NFL quarterbacks in rushing yards.  The Bengals' main deep threat was rookie wide receiver Cris Collinsworth, who caught 67 passes for 1,009 yards and 8 touchdowns.  Tight end Dan Ross had 71 receptions for 910 yards and 5 touchdowns, while wide receivers Isaac Curtis and Steve Kreider each recorded 37 receptions, combining for a total of 1,129 yards and 9 touchdowns.  Fullback Pete Johnson was the leading rusher on the team with 1,077 yards and 12 touchdowns. He was also a good receiver out of the backfield, catching 46 passes for another 320 yards and 4 touchdowns.  Halfback Charles Alexander contributed 554 all-purpose yards and 28 receptions.  A big reason for Cincinnati's production on offense was their line, led by future Hall of Fame tackle Anthony Muñoz and guard Max Montoya.  On special teams, punter Pat McInally made the Pro Bowl with a 45.4 yards-per-punt average.

The Bengals also had a good defense that had not given up more than 30 points in any game that season.  Their line was anchored by defensive ends Ross Browner and Eddie Edwards, who did a great job stopping the run.  Cincinnati's defense was also led by defensive backs Louis Breeden and Ken Riley, and linebackers Bo Harris, Jim LeClair, and Reggie Williams, who intercepted four passes and recovered three fumbles.

Playoffs

The Bengals earned their first playoff victory in team history by defeating the Buffalo Bills 28–21, then beating the San Diego Chargers 27–7 in a game known as the Freezer Bowl because of the −59 wind chill conditions at Riverfront Stadium. Meanwhile, the 49ers would defeat the New York Giants 38–24, then narrowly beat the Dallas Cowboys 28–27 on a last-minute touchdown pass known as The Catch.

Super Bowl pregame news
The 49ers had handily beaten the Bengals in a December game played in Cincinnati and consequently were installed as a 1-point favorite. That said, going into Super Bowl XVI, most experts agreed that both teams were very evenly matched, but many thought Pete Johnson's rushing ability could prove to be the difference. Some also pointed out that Ken Anderson was an established 11-year veteran who had just finished the best season of his career, while the young Montana was only just starting to emerge as a top-notch quarterback.  Furthermore, Anderson had advanced through the playoffs without throwing a single interception, while Montana had been intercepted 4 times, 3 of them in the NFC title game.

During the season, both teams had shown impressive ball security.  Cincinnati had the fewest turnovers of any team during the 1981 season with 24, while San Francisco ranked second with 25.

Cincinnati head coach Forrest Gregg became the first man to play in a Super Bowl and then be a head coach in a Super Bowl.  Gregg played in Super Bowls I and II as a member of the Green Bay Packers. (Gregg was on the roster for the Dallas Cowboys for Super Bowl VI, but did not play.)  Tom Flores was on the Kansas City Chiefs' roster in Super Bowl IV and coached in Super Bowl XV. However, Flores did not play in Super Bowl IV.

This was the first Super Bowl to feature two first-time participants since Super Bowl III (there has been only one since, Super Bowl XX between the Chicago Bears and New England Patriots).  This was also the only Super Bowl to date between two teams who had losing records the previous season, although Super Bowl XXXIV matched a team that had a losing record in 1998 (St. Louis Rams) against a team that finished a mediocre 8–8 that year (Tennessee Titans). This is the most recent Super Bowl in which both teams had never appeared in any AFL/NFL title game before the merger (the 49ers had played in the final championship game of the All-America Football Conference before joining the NFL in 1950).

This is the only Super Bowl to be played at the Pontiac Silverdome. The Super Bowl did return to Michigan for Super Bowl XL, but that game was played at Ford Field in Detroit, which, in 2002, had replaced the Pontiac Silverdome as the home site for the Detroit Lions. This was also only the second Super Bowl to not take place in one of the three so-called 'big Super Bowl Cities' (the other was Houston in January 1974). Fourteen of the previous 15 Super Bowls took place in either Miami, Florida, New Orleans, Louisiana or in the Greater Los Angeles Area.

As the designated home team, the Bengals wore their black home uniforms with white pants, while the 49ers donned their road white uniforms with gold pants.

On the day of the game, a 49ers bus which had Bill Walsh and Montana on board was stuck in traffic due to bad weather and a motorcade carrying then-Vice President George H. W. Bush.  As a result, they did not arrive at the stadium until 90 minutes before kickoff time.  "Coach Walsh was pretty loose on the bus," Montana told Sports Illustrated after the game. "He said, ‘I’ve got the radio on and we’re leading 7-0. The trainer’s calling the plays.’"

Broadcasting
The game was televised in the United States by CBS and featured the broadcast team of play-by-play announcer Pat Summerall and color commentator John Madden (the latter making his Super Bowl debut as a broadcaster). The broadcast also featured the introduction of the telestrator to a national audience, that was named CBS Chalkboard. Still in use today, it enables players and areas of play to be highlighted by the superimposing of lines and rings drawn by a freehand operator.

Hosting coverage for The Super Bowl Today pregame (90 minutes), halftime, and postgame shows was the NFL Today crew of Brent Musburger; Irv Cross; Phyllis George and Jimmy "The Greek" Snyder, with studio analysis from then-Pittsburgh Steelers quarterback Terry Bradshaw (who coincidentally had faced these very same 49ers during the regular season and lost 17–14) and Roger Staubach. CBS, for this game, used the theme for the CBS Sports Saturday/Sunday for the intro (CBS had aired a special CBS Sports Sunday prior to the beginning of Super Bowl XVI coverage).  This Super Bowl was simulcast in Canada on the CTV Television Network, which was airing the Super Bowl for the first time.

The game was one of the most watched broadcasts in American television history, with more than 85 million viewers.  The final national Nielsen rating was 49.1 (a 73 share), which is still a Super Bowl record, and ranks second to the final episode of M*A*S*H in 1983 among television broadcasts in general. (Super Bowl XLIX holds the record for total U.S. viewership, with an average audience of 114 million, but only earned a rating of 47.5 and a 72 share). As of 2023, Super Bowl XVI remains the highest rated championship game in the history of the National Football League.

The game was broadcast on nationwide radio by CBS and featured the broadcast team of play-by-play announcer Jack Buck and color commentator Hank Stram.  Hosting coverage for CBS was done by Dick Stockton.  Locally, Super Bowl XVI was broadcast by KCBS-AM in San Francisco with Don Klein and Wayne Walker and by WLW-AM in Cincinnati with Phil Samp and Andy MacWilliams.

60 Minutes was broadcast after the game on CBS, representing the Super Bowl lead-out program. At the end of CBS' telecast, they played ABBA's "The Winner Takes It All" over a montage of the 49ers playing in the game and the city of San Francisco.

Entertainment

The pregame festivities featured the University of Michigan Band. The band later performed the Canadian National Anthem, which was not televised.  Singer Diana Ross (a Detroit native) then performed the U.S. national anthem, which followed a moment of silence in support of the Polish trade union Solidarity following the crackdown by the communist government of Poland on the pro-democracy union. Ross would later perform at the halftime show for Super Bowl XXX. This was the first of two Super Bowls, both held in Michigan, in which two national anthems were performed, and to have a joint Canadian-American armed forces color guard, which consisted of members of the Royal Canadian Mounted Police and Camp Grayling color guards.  The coin toss ceremony featured Hall of Fame quarterback Bobby Layne, a star with the Lions from 1950 to 1958.

Up with People provided the halftime entertainment featuring a salute to the 1960s and Motown. This was the first Super Bowl to be played in the Midwest.

Game summary

First quarter
The Bengals had the first opportunity to score early in the game. After returning the opening kickoff 17 yards, San Francisco rookie returner Amos Lawrence was hit by Bengals rookie linebacker Guy Frazier and fumbled at his own 26-yard line (the first time in a Super Bowl that a turnover took place on the opening kick), where John Simmons recovered for Cincinnati. Quarterback Ken Anderson then started the drive off with a completion to wide receiver Isaac Curtis for 8 yards, and fullback Pete Johnson's 2-yard run then picked up a first down. Anderson followed with an 11-yard pass to tight end Dan Ross, moving the ball to the 5-yard line.  However, Anderson threw an incomplete pass on first down, then was sacked by defensive end Jim Stuckey on second down for a 6-yard loss. Facing third down, Anderson tried to connect with Curtis in the end zone, but 49ers safety Dwight Hicks intercepted the ball at the 5-yard line and returned it 27 yards to the 32.

From there, quarterback Joe Montana led the 49ers offense to the Cincinnati 47-yard line with three consecutive completions. Then, the 49ers ran a fake reverse – flea flicker play that involved wide receiver Freddie Solomon and ended with Montana completing a 14-yard pass to tight end Charle Young at the 33. Three running plays and Montana's 14-yard completion to Solomon moved the ball to the 1-yard line. Finally, Montana scored on a 1-yard quarterback sneak, giving San Francisco a 7–0 lead.

Second quarter
The Bengals threatened to score early in the second quarter when they advanced across the San Francisco 30-yard line. But after catching a 19-yard pass from Anderson at the 5-yard line, wide receiver Cris Collinsworth lost a fumble while being tackled by 49ers defensive back Eric Wright. After recovering the fumble, the 49ers drove for a Super Bowl record 92 yards, scoring on a 10-yard pass from Montana to fullback Earl Cooper, increasing their lead to 14–0. The play Cooper scored on had not been called by Bill Walsh for two years. Cooper's leaping, celebratory spike of the football after scoring became the photo Sports Illustrated used for its post-game cover.

Following the touchdown came a squib kick by kicker Ray Wersching that was finally recovered by Bengal receiver David Verser, who was quickly tackled at the 2-yard line. According to the NFL's highlight film for the game, the 49ers had discovered Wersching's ability to effectively use the squib during their 1981 season opener when a leg injury kept him from fully powering into the football; because that game was also played at the Silverdome, Bill Walsh felt that Wersching would be able to recreate the crazy bounces of a squib on the hard AstroTurf by shortening his stride and seeing what happened. The Bengals could only advance to their 25 before having Pat McInally boot a 47-yard punt, and with just over 4 minutes left in the half, Montana led the 49ers on another scoring drive. First, he completed a 17-yard pass to wide receiver Dwight Clark at the Cincinnati 49-yard line.  Then, running back Ricky Patton ran twice, advancing the ball to the 39-yard line.  Montana's next two completions to Clark (his 4th and final reception of the game) and Solomon moved the ball to the 5-yard line. But then Montana threw two straight incompletions, forcing the 49ers to settle for Wersching's 22-yard field goal to increase their lead to 17–0.

With just 15 seconds left in the half, Wersching kicked a second squib kick that was muffed by Bengals running back Archie Griffin, and the 49ers recovered the ball on the Bengals' 4-yard line. As they lined-up for a field goal attempt, a false start penalty against San Francisco pushed them back 5 yards but Wersching connected from 26 yards, increasing the 49ers' lead to 20–0, which was the largest halftime lead in Super Bowl history to that date, breaking the previous record of 17 points set by Miami in Super Bowl VIII.

Third quarter
After receiving the opening kickoff of the second half, the Bengals drove 83 yards in 9 plays.  Charles Alexander started off the drive with a 13-yard carry, with a facemask penalty on Hicks giving an additional 5 yards.  Two plays later, Anderson converted a 3rd and 4 situation with a 19-yard pass to Steve Kreider, and eventually finished the drive with a 5-yard touchdown run to cut the deficit to 20–7. This seemed to fire up Cincinnati's defense, which limited the 49ers to only 8 plays and 4 offensive yards for the entire third quarter.

Later in the quarter, Bengals defensive back Mike Fuller's 17-yard punt return gave the Bengals the ball at midfield.  Two penalties and a 4-yard sack pushed them back to their own 37, but on third down, Anderson's 49-yard pass to Collinsworth (the longest play of the game) moved the ball to the San Francisco 14-yard line. Johnson then later successfully converted on a fourth down run, giving the Bengals a first down on the 3-yard line. On that play, the 49ers only had 10 players on the field because linebacker Keena Turner, who was seriously ill with chicken pox during Super Bowl week, missed a call to enter the game.

On first down, Johnson drove into the line and gained 2 yards down to the 49ers' 1-yard line.  The Bengals then tried to run Johnson into the line on second down, but lost a yard when a charging rush prevented the Bengals from executing their blocking assignments. Cincinnati receiver David Verser also missed a blocking audible by Anderson.  On third down, 49ers linebacker Dan Bunz made probably the key defensive play of the game. Anderson faked to Johnson and threw a swing pass out to Alexander, who was isolated on Bunz. Bunz, however, corralled Alexander at the line of scrimmage on an open-field tackle and kept him from reaching the end zone. Highlights showed that Alexander was supposed to have entered the end zone before making his cut, and his early turn prevented a touchdown pass.

After calling a timeout, rather than attempting a field goal on fourth down, the Bengals sent Johnson into the middle of the line one last time. But San Francisco cornerback Ronnie Lott and linebackers Bunz and Jack "Hacksaw" Reynolds tackled him for no gain, giving the ball back to the 49ers.

Fourth quarter
The 49ers only gained 8 yards on their ensuing drive, and the Bengals got the ball back after receiving Jim Miller's 44-yard punt at their own 47-yard line. Taking advantage of their great starting field position, the Bengals marched 53 yards in 7 plays and scored a touchdown on a 4-yard pass from Anderson to Ross. With the score, the deficit was cut to 20–14 with 10:06 left in regulation.

However, the 49ers countered with a 50-yard, 9-play drive that took 4:41 off the clock, and included Montana's 22-yard pass to receiver Mike Wilson (his longest and final pass of the game) and seven consecutive running plays. Wilson's reception was a play Walsh specifically designed for the Super Bowl that capitalized on the Bengals doing a long-run coverage on Wilson anytime he ran a pass route over 20 yards; Wilson simply ran 25 yards straight out and then cut back to receive Montana's precision pass. Wersching ended the drive with a 40-yard field goal to give San Francisco a 23–14 lead with just 5 minutes left.

On the Bengals' first play after receiving the ensuing kickoff, Eric Wright intercepted an Anderson pass intended for Collinsworth. After returning the interception 25 yards, Wright fumbled while being tackled by Bengals guard Max Montoya, but San Francisco linebacker Willie Harper recovered the ball at the Bengals' 22.

The 49ers then ran the ball on five consecutive plays, taking 3 minutes off the clock, to advance to the Cincinnati 6-yard line. Wersching then kicked his fourth field goal to increase the 49ers' lead to 26–14 with less than 2 minutes left in the game. Wersching's 4 field goals tied a Super Bowl record set by Green Bay Packers kicker Don Chandler in Super Bowl II. Because of his 4 field goals and the close score, this is the only Super Bowl in which the losing team scored more touchdowns than the winning team (Cincinnati 3, San Francisco 2).

Anderson completed six consecutive passes on the Bengals' ensuing drive, the last one a 3-yard touchdown pass to Ross to make the score 26–21.  However, none of the receivers on Anderson's completions were able to get out of bounds to stop the clock.  By the time Ross scored, only 16 seconds remained in the game.  The Bengals tried an onside kick, but Clark recovered the ball for the 49ers, allowing San Francisco to run out the clock to win the game.

Notable performances
The game featured several great performances by players on both teams. Montana threw for 157 yards and a touchdown, while rushing for another 18 yards and a touchdown. Wright had an interception and forced a fumble. Cris Collinsworth (the game's leading receiver) caught 5 passes for 107 yards, an average of 21.4 yards per catch. Dan Ross had 11 receptions for 104 yards and 2 touchdowns. Collinsworth and Ross became the second pair of teammates to each have 100 yards receiving in a Super Bowl. Collinsworth had 107, while Ross had 104. John Stallworth and Lynn Swann were the first to do so in Super Bowl XIII. Patton was the game's leading rusher with 55 yards on 17 carries.

Fuller gained 35 yards on 4 punt returns. Ross caught 11 passes (the most ever by a tight end in a Super Bowl) and he was tied for the most receptions in a Super Bowl with Jerry Rice (who tied Ross' record in the Super Bowl rematch 7 years later), Deion Branch, and Wes Welker until Demaryius Thomas broke that record in Super Bowl XLVIII with 13 catches. Anderson finished the game completing 25 of 34 pass attempts for 300 yards with 2 touchdowns and 2 interceptions. He also gained 14 rushing yards and a touchdown on 6 carries.  Anderson's 25 completions and his 73.5 completion percentage were both Super Bowl records. Wersching scored 14 points on 4 field goals and 2 PATs. Wersching's squib kickoffs caused 2 Cincinnati fumbles; the 49ers recovered one of them, leading to their 2nd field goal. With the victory, Montana became at the time the second youngest quarterback to win a Super Bowl (just behind his idol Joe Namath; Namath was 25 years, 7 months, and 12 days old when he won Super Bowl III, while Montana was a day older).

Box score

Final statistics
Sources: NFL.com Super Bowl XVI, Super Bowl XVI Play Finder SF, Super Bowl XVI Play Finder Cin

Statistical comparison

Individual statistics

1Completions/attempts
2Carries
3Long gain
4Receptions
5Times targeted

Records set
The following records were set in Super Bowl XVI, according to the official NFL.com boxscore and the Pro-Football-Reference.com game summary. Some records have to meet NFL minimum number of attempts to be recognized. The minimums are shown (in parenthesis).

Starting lineups
Source:

Officials
Referee: Pat Haggerty #4 second Super Bowl (XIII)
Umpire: Al Conway #7 third Super Bowl (IX, XIV)
Head Linesman: Jerry Bergman #17 second Super Bowl (XIII)
Line Judge: Bob Beeks #16 second Super Bowl (XIV)
Back Judge: Bill Swanson #20 second Super Bowl (XI)
Side Judge: Bob Rice #19 first Super Bowl
Field Judge: Don Hakes #6 first Super Bowl
Alternate Referee: Gene Barth #14 worked Super Bowl XVIII on the field
Alternate Umpire: Pat Harder #8 did not work Super Bowl on field

NOTE: Officials were numbered separately by position from 1979 to 1981. In 1982, the league reverted to the pre-1979 practice of assigning each official a different number.
Bergman, Beeks, Swanson and Hakes all worked together on the same crew during the regular season, a rarity.

In pop culture
 In The Simpsons episode Homer and Ned's Hail Mary Pass, Homer Simpson and Ned Flanders watch a fictitious Super Bowl XVI for inspiration to craft a halftime show.

References

Notes

Sources

 https://www.pro-football-reference.com – Large online database of NFL data and statistics
 Super Bowl play-by-plays from USA Today (Last accessed September 28, 2005)
 All-Time Super Bowl Odds from The Sports Network (Last accessed October 16, 2005)
 http://sportsillustrated.cnn.com/football/features/superbowl/archives/16/

External links
 Super Bowl official website

Super Bowl
San Francisco 49ers postseason
Cincinnati Bengals postseason
1981 National Football League season
Sports in Pontiac, Michigan
1982 in sports in Michigan
January 1982 sports events in the United States
American football competitions in Michigan
1982 in American television
1982 in American football